Tring Athletic Football Club are an English football club based in Tring, Hertfordshire.

History
The club joined the West Herts Saturday League in the early 1960s, and despite only fielding players under-21, they won the Division One title three times in five years.

Following a spell without success, the age limit was scrapped in 1971 and the club was renamed Tring Athletic. In the mid-1970s the ground was sold to the local council and the club were relegated to Division Three. However, by the mid-1980s they were back in the Premier Division.

In 1988 the club joined Division One of the South Midlands League. They returned to Miswell Lane in 1992. After missing out on the Senior Division title in 1997–98 on goal difference, they won the league in 1999–00. In the same season they also won the Herts Charity Shield, the Herts Senior Centenary Trophy and the Cherry Red Books Trophy.

Due to an inability to install floodlights at Miswell Lane, in 2003 the club absorbed Isthmian League neighbours Tring Town F.C. with an agreement to move to their Pendley ground, which already had floodlights. In 2003–04 they finished fourth in Division One and were promoted to the Premier Division.

Players

First-team squad

Honours
Spartan South Midlands League
Senior Division champions 1999–2000
Challenge Trophy winners 2008–09
Premier Division Cup winners 2008–09, 2021–2022
St Marys Cup winners 1996–97, 1998–99, 2004–05, 2008–09
Division One Cup winners 1998–99, 2002–03
Cherry Red Books Trophy winners 1999–2000, 2000–01
West Herts League
Division One champions 1961–62, 1964–65, 1965–66
Challenge Cup winners 1965–66
Herts Charity Shield
Winners 1999–2000, 2001–02, 2007–08
Herts Senior Centenary Trophy
Winners 1999–2000, 2000–01, 2002–03

References

External links
Club website

Football clubs in England
Spartan South Midlands Football League
Tring
Dacorum
Association football clubs established in 1958
South Midlands League
Football clubs in Hertfordshire
1958 establishments in England
Isthmian League